Salahaddin University-Erbil (Zankoy Selaheddîn-hewler, زانکۆی سەلاحەدین-هەولێر in Kurdish) is one of the public higher education institution in the North of Iraq and especially in Kurdistan region. It is located in Erbil (Hewler), capital of the autonomous Kurdistan Region of Iraq.  Sulaimani University-Sulaimani was established in 1968. It was moved to Erbil in 1981 and changed its name to Salaheddin university. Initially, the university included seven Academic Colleges: Science, Agriculture, Engineering, Administration, Arts, Education, and Medicine. In 1985, a college of Law and Politics was added, followed by the college of Dentistry in 1995. Several more were established in the following years so that by 2004, the university offered courses in 22 departments. In 2005, the departments of Medicine, Dentistry, Nursing, and Pharmacy split from Salahaddin University to establish Hawler Medical University.

The University is a member of the International Association of Universities (listed under the Iraq section with its Kurdish name Zankoy Salahaddin) and grants various academic degrees and certificates to qualified individuals, including Bachelor of Arts (BA), Bachelor of Science (BSc), Master of Arts (MA), Master of Science (MSc), and Doctorate of Philosophy (PhD).  A Medical degree (MD) is also granted by the Medical College.

Faculties and colleges
College of Science
College of Engineering
College of Agriculture Engineering Sciences
College of Education
College of Arts
College of Languages
College of Administration and Economics
College of Law
College of Political Science
College of Basic Education
College of Physical Education and Sport Sciences
College of Islamic Studies
College of Fine Arts
College of Shaqlawa Education
College of Makhmoor Education

Child Universities 
 Hawler Medical University (Erbil city)
 Soran University (Soran city)

Notable alumni
The university has more than 100,000 alumni, including Nawzad Hadi, The Governor of Erbil, Yousif Mohammed, The President of Kurdistan Parliament, and Nouri al-Maliki, ex-Prime Minister of Iraq.

References

External links

 
Buildings and structures in Erbil
Universities in Kurdistan Region (Iraq)
Educational institutions established in 1968
1968 establishments in Iraq
Public universities
Erbil
University-Erbil